The following is an overview of the events of 1890 in film, including a list of films released and notable births and deaths.

Events
 The first moving pictures were developed on celluloid film by William Friese Greene, a British inventor, in Hyde Park, London in 1889. The process was patented in 1890.
 William K. L. Dickson completes his work for Thomas Edison on the Kinetograph cylinder either in this year or 1889. Monkeyshines No. 1 becomes the first film shot on the system.

Films
London's Trafalgar Square, directed by William Carr Croft and Wordsworth Donisthorpe.
Monkeyshines, No. 1 – contradictory sources indicate this was shot either in June 1889 or November 1890, Monkeyshines, No. 2 and Monkeyshines, No. 3, directed by William K. L. Dickson.
Mosquinha, directed by Étienne-Jules Marey.
Traffic in King's Road, Chelsea, directed by William Friese-Greene.

Births

Deaths
 c. September 16 – Louis Le Prince, French film pioneer, director of Roundhay Garden Scene (born 1842)
 c. December 21 – Johanne Luise Heiberg, Danish Actress, dies at 78 (born 1812)

Notes

External links

 
Film by year